Poulsen is a Danish patronymic surname meaning "son of Poul" (Danish version of Paul). The form Paulsen is a less common cognate.

People with the name include:

Sportspeople 
Aage Poulsen (1919–1998), Danish long-distance runner
Anders Poulsen (ice hockey) (born 1991), Danish hockey player
Anders Poulsen (referee) (born 1981), Danish football referee
Andreas Poulsen (born 1999), Danish footballer
Annette Poulsen (born 1969), Danish swimmer
Christian Poulsen (born 1980), Danish professional football player
Christian Poulsen (chess player) (1912–1981), Danish chess master
Christian Poulsen (cyclist) (born 1979), Danish cyclist
Christopher Poulsen (born 1981), Danish footballer
Hanne Høegh Poulsen (born 1981), Danish taekwondo practitioner
Jakob Poulsen (born 1983), Danish professional football player
Jan B. Poulsen (born 1946), Danish football manager
Jonas Kældsø Poulsen (born 1985), Danish windsurfer
Kaj Poulsen (born 1942), Danish footballer
Kasper Poulsen, Danish wheelchair curler
Katja Poulsen (born 1976), Danish archer
Ken Poulsen (1947–2017), American baseball player
Kim Poulsen (born 1959), Danish football manager
Kristian Poulsen (born 1975), Danish racing driver
Lív Poulsen (born 1997), Danish footballer
Maria Poulsen (born 1984), Danish curler
Mette Poulsen (born 1993), Danish badminton player
Mikkel Poulsen (born 1984), Danish curler
Olaf Klitgaard Poulsen (1914–2007), Danish rower
Ole Poulsen (born 1941), Danish sport sailer
Poul Byrge Poulsen (1915–1994), Danish rower
René Holten Poulsen (born 1988), Danish sprint canoeist
Rikke Poulsen (born 1986), Danish handball player
Roald Poulsen (born 1950), Danish football manager
Rógvi Poulsen (born 1989), Faroese footballer
Sandy Poulsen (born 1952), American alpine skier
Simon Poulsen (born 1984), Danish professional football player
Svenne Poulsen (born 1980), Danish footballer
Thomas Poulsen (born 1970), Danish rower
Willy Poulsen (born 1946), Danish rower
Yussuf Poulsen (born 1994), Danish footballer

Other people 
Axel Poulsen (1887–1972), Danish sculptor
Erik Poulsen (born 1964), American politician
Gudrun Poulsen (1918–1999), Danish painter
Hanna Poulsen (born 1984), Finnish model, Miss Finland 2005
Hans Poulsen (born 1945), Australian singer-songwriter
Henrik Poulsen (disambiguation), multiple people
Jógvan Poulsen, Lawman of the Faroe Islands
Jógvan Poulsen (1854–1941), Faroese politician
Johan Poulsen (1890–1980), Faroese politician
Johanne Astrid Poulsen (born 2006), Danish drummer
Johannes Poulsen (1881–1938), Danish actor and director
Karen Poulsen (1881–1953), Danish stage and film actress
Kevin Poulsen (born 1965), American black hat hacker and senior editor at Wired News
Michael Poulsen (born 1975), lead singer of the Danish rock band Volbeat
Morten Poulsen (born 1988), Danish hockey player
Nicolai Poulsen (born 1993), Danish footballer
Niels Winther Poulsen (1902–1990), Faroese politician 
Olaf Poulsen (1849–1923), Danish actor
Poul Poulsen Nolsøe (1766–1809), Faroese national hero
Roy G. Poulsen (1918–2006), American economist
Sally-Ann Poulsen, Australian chemical biologist
Sara Poulsen (born 1984), Danish actress
Søren Pape Poulsen (born 1971), Danish politician
Svend Poulsen (–), Danish military commander
Tórbjørn Poulsen (1932–2014), Faroese politician
Troels Lund Poulsen (born 1976), Danish politician
Ulla Poulsen (1905–2001), Danish ballerina and actress
Valdemar Poulsen (1869–1942), Danish engineer

Danish-language surnames
Patronymic surnames
Surnames from given names